Berezovaya Gora is a rural locality (a village) in Kichmengskoye Rural Settlement, Kichmengsko-Gorodetsky District, Vologda Oblast, Russia. The population was 162 as of 2002. There are 2 streets.

Geography 
Berezovaya Gora is located 15 km southwest of Kichmengsky Gorodok (the district's administrative centre) by road. Podol is the nearest rural locality.

References 

Rural localities in Kichmengsko-Gorodetsky District